The Embassy of Italy in Prague is located on Nerudova street in Mala Strana, Prague, next door to the church of Our Lady of Caetans and opposite the Romanian Embassy. 

It occupies the large Thun-Hohenstein Palace, which is named after the Thun und Hohenstein family. The embassy's baroque facade features a doorway guarded by two carved eagles.

Bibliography 
  As described in

External links 

Official website of the embassy

Italy
Prague
Czech Republic–Italy relations
Palaces in Prague
Czechoslovakia–Italy relations